Carolina Ann Maria van der Plas (born 6 June 1967) is a Dutch journalist and politician who has served as a member of the House of Representatives since 2021. A former member of the Christian Democratic Appeal (CDA), which she left in 2019, she is the founder and current party leader of the Farmer–Citizen Movement (BBB).

Biography

Early life and career 
Van der Plas was born on 6 June 1967 in Cuijk to a Dutch father and an Irish mother. Her father, Wil van der Plas (1937–2014), was a sports journalist and worked for the regional newspaper Deventer Dagblad. Her mother, Nuala Fitzpatrick, is a retired politician of the Christian Democratic Appeal (CDA), who served as an alderman in the municipal executive of Deventer. 

Van der Plas began her career as a journalist, covering the meat industry for Reed Business. She would later shift to communications, providing support to agricultural workers' associations and the Dutch Association of Pig Farmers.

Political career 
Originally a member of the CDA, Van der Plas left the party shortly after the 2019 provincial elections. During her membership, she had frequently criticised the party for not doing enough to represent the interests of the agricultural sector. In response to the widespread farmers' protests that took place in the Netherlands in October 2019, she then founded the Farmer–Citizen Movement (BBB).

On 17 October 2020, Van der Plas was unanimously chosen as the party leader of the BBB. Her campaign for the 2021 general election focused on issues important to rural and agrarian voters, including pledges for a "Ministry of the Countryside" located at least 100 kilometres from The Hague, and a removal of the ban on neonicotinoids. The party won one seat in the House of Representatives, and Van der Plas was installed on 31 March 2021.

Personal life
Van der Plas lives in Deventer and has two sons. Her husband, Jan Gruben, died in 2019 of pancreatic cancer.

References

External link

1967 births
21st-century Dutch politicians
21st-century Dutch women politicians
Dutch agrarianists
Dutch journalists
Dutch people of Irish descent
Dutch political party founders
Dutch public relations people
Farmer–Citizen Movement politicians
Leaders of political parties in the Netherlands
Living people
Members of the House of Representatives (Netherlands)
People from Cuijk
People from Deventer
20th-century Dutch women